Anton Marchl (born 19 March 1965) is an Austrian wrestler. He competed in the men's Greco-Roman 74 kg at the 1992 Summer Olympics.

References

External links
 

1965 births
Living people
Austrian male sport wrestlers
Olympic wrestlers of Austria
Wrestlers at the 1992 Summer Olympics
People from Salzburg-Umgebung District
Sportspeople from Salzburg (state)